Encores! is a Tony-honored concert series dedicated to performing rarely heard American musicals, usually with their original orchestrations. Presented by New York City Center since 1994, Encores! has revived shows by Irving Berlin, Rodgers & Hart, George and Ira Gershwin, Cole Porter, Leonard Bernstein, and Stephen Sondheim, among many others.  Encores!  was the brainchild of Judith Daykin, who launched the series shortly after becoming Executive Director of City Center in 1992.  Besides initiating Encores!, Daykin is credited for turning City Center from a rental hall into a presenting organization.  The series has spawned nineteen cast recordings and numerous Broadway transfers, including Kander and Ebb's Chicago, which is now the second longest-running musical in Broadway history. Videotapes of many Encores! productions are collected at the Billy Rose Theater Collection of the New York Public Library for the Performing Arts. The series was led by artistic director Jack Viertel from 2001 to 2020; in October 2019, City Center announced that Lear deBessonet will take over as artistic director beginning with the 2021 Encores! season.

From 2000 to 2001, City Center presented a short-lived sister series, Voices!, devoted to staged readings of infrequently-produced American plays and produced by Alec Baldwin. From 2007 to 2009, the spin-off series Encores! Summer Stars featured fully-staged productions of classic Broadway musicals, beginning with a production of Gypsy starring Patti LuPone, Boyd Gaines, and Laura Benanti. Gypsy received unprecedented attention for an Encores! show and eventually transferred to Broadway; LuPone, Gaines, and Benanti all won Tony Awards for their performances.

In 2013, City Center launched Encores! Off-Center!, a sister series devoted to groundbreaking Off-Broadway musicals. Led by founding artistic director Jeanine Tesori for its first four seasons, Encores! Off-Center was subsequently led by Michael Friedman (2017), Tesori and Anne Kauffman (2018), and Kauffman (2019–present).

Encores! Productions

Two Encores! productions scheduled for the spring of 2020 were canceled due to COVID-19. Kurt Weill and Alan Jay Lerner's 1948 musical Love Life was to have starred Kate Baldwin and  Brian Stokes Mitchell; a revised version of Jeanine Tesori and Dick Scanlan's 2002 musical Thoroughly Modern Millie was to have starred Ashley Park.

Voices!

Encores! Summer Stars

Encores! Off-Center

Special Events

Notes

Transferred to Broadway.
Received a cast recording.

References

External links
Encores! on the New York City Center website
2005 American Theatre Wing interview with Jack Viertel
2007 American Theatre Wing panel "The Evolution of Encores!", featuring Ted Chapin, Judith Daykin, Rob Fisher, David Ives, and Jack Viertel

Musical theatre companies
Theatre in New York City
1994 establishments in New York City